The 1991 IX ACB International Tournament "VIII Memorial Héctor Quiroga" was the 9th semi-official edition of the European Basketball Club Super Cup. It took place at Pabellón Municipal de Puerto Real, Puerto Real, Spain, on 6, 7 and 8 September 1991 with the participations of Slobodna Dalmacija (champions of the 1990–91 FIBA European Champions Cup), FC Barcelona Banca Catalana (runners-up of the 1990–91 FIBA European Champions Cup), Montigalà Joventut (champions of the 1990–91 Liga ACB) and Maccabi Elite Tel Aviv (champions of the 1990–91 Premier League).

League stage
Day 1, September 6, 1991

|}

Day 2, September 7, 1991

|}

Day 3, September 8, 1991

|}

Final standings 

European Basketball Club Super Cup
1991–92 in European basketball
1991–92 in Spanish basketball
1991–92 in Israeli basketball
1991–92 in Yugoslav basketball
International basketball competitions hosted by Spain